WQNS (105.1 FM, "Rock 105.1") is a mainstream rock radio station in Asheville, North Carolina.

History
WQNS signed on in 1979 at 104.9 FM as WQNS-FM (WQNS stood for...Waynesville's Quiet New Sound) and played easy listening music. When the station sold, it turned country and was branded Q-105 "Always Your Country".

In 1990, WQNS/WHCC owner KAT Communications of Myrtle Beach, South Carolina filed for Chapter 11, but the stations were doing well and no changes were planned.

On October 28, 1997, the format changed to Classic rock and country music moved to WHCC (now WMXF).  On September 20, 1999, WQNS was paired with WQNQ (formerly hot adult contemporary WMXF), and the two stations became "Rock 104". Clear Channel bought the three stations in 2001. In 2005, the simulcast was broken off after WQNQ's signal was upgraded and changed back to Hot Adult Contemporary, but 104.9's Classic Rock format remained.

On January 10, 2014, WQNS completed its move to Woodfin, North Carolina by moving its tower into Asheville, North Carolina and moving from 104.9 FM to 105.1 FM and rebranded as "Rock 105.1". The Federal Communications Commission issued the license for the move to Woodfin and 105.1 FM on June 25, 2014.

Previous logos
 (WQNS's logo under previous 104.9 FM frequency)

References

External links
Official Website

QNS
Mainstream rock radio stations in the United States
IHeartMedia radio stations